Michael Kahn may refer to:
Michael Kahn (film editor) (born 1930), American film editor
Michael Kahn (theatre director) (born 1937), American theatre director and drama educator, artistic director of the Shakespeare Theatre Company, Washington, D.C.
Michael Kahn (businessman), American businessman, founder and CEO of Kahn Ventures, Inc.
Mike Kahn (1954–2008), American sports journalist